Amelanchier arborea (downy serviceberry or common serviceberry), is native to eastern North America from the Gulf Coast north to Thunder Bay in Ontario and Lake St. John in Quebec, and west to Texas and Minnesota.

Other common names are "shadberries" (as their blossoming coincides with the shad runs in New England), "Juneberries" (because the berries usually set on in June), and "Service" or "Sarvice" berries because their blooms mean that the muddy back roads into the "coves and hollers" of Appalachia will soon be passable for circuit-riding preachers and the communities will be able to have Sunday services again. (Some say, more morbidly, that it means the ground is soft enough to dig, which means that those who died over winter can be buried and have services said over them.)

The bark is smooth and gray.

The buds are slender with a pointed tip, and usually more than two scales visible. A characteristic useful for identification is that the young leaves emerge downy on the underside. The fall color is variable, from orange-yellow to pinkish or reddish.

The petals are white. The flowers are pollinated by bees. The fruit is a reddish-purple pome, resembling a small apple in shape. They ripen in summer and are very popular with birds. The fruit is eaten by over 40 species of birds and various mammals, including squirrels, rabbits, chipmunks, mice, voles, foxes,  black bears, deer, and elk. 

It also commonly hybridizes with other species of Amelanchier, the hybrid Amelanchier × grandiflora being one example, and identification can be very difficult as a result.

Cultivation
This species tolerates varying light levels, but is at its best in full sun. It requires good drainage and air circulation and should be watered during drought. It is often confused with other species in the nursery trade. Propagation is by seed, divisions and grafting.

The edible fruit is drier than some other serviceberries, and it is harvested locally for pies and jams, and has been known to be used for wine; they were also used by Native Americans to make bread.

Some report that the sweetened juice tastes like Dr. Pepper and some nurseries sell them as "The Dr. Pepper Tree", but the fruit is not used in the soft drink.

References

External links

 

arborea
Flora of Eastern Canada
Flora of the Eastern United States
Flora of the United States
Trees of Ontario
Trees of Quebec
Trees of the Southeastern United States
Trees of the Northeastern United States
Trees of the United States
Trees of the Great Lakes region (North America)